The Regiment "Lancieri Vittorio Emanuele II" (10th) ( - "Lancers Vittorio Emanuele II") is an inactive cavalry unit of the Italian Army.

History

Formation 
On 10 June 1859 the Cavalry Regiment Vittorio Emanuele was formed in Turin with volunteers, who had come from Veneto and the Romagna for the Second Italian War of Independence. The regiment was named for the King of Sardinia Victor Emmanuel II. On 26 March 1860 the regiment was integrated into the Royal Sardinian Army.

On 6 June 1860 the regiment was reorganized as a lancer unit and renamed Regiment "Lancieri Vittorio Emanuele". In fall of the same year the regiment participated in the Sardinian campaign in central and southern Italy. On 18 September 1860 the regiment fought in the Battle of Castelfidardo and from 24 to 29 September in the siege of Ancona. In 1866 the regiment participated in the Third Italian War of Independence. Over the next years the regiment repeatedly changed its name:
 10 September 1871: 10th Regiment of Cavalry (Vittorio Emanuele)
 5 November 1876: Cavalry Regiment "Vittorio Emanuele" (10th)
 16 December 1897: Regiment "Lancieri Vittorio Emanuele" (10th)

In 1887 the regiment contributed to the formation of the Mounted Hunters Squadron, which fought in the Italo-Ethiopian War of 1887–1889. In 1895-96 the regiment provided one officer and 68 enlisted for units deployed to Italian Eritrea for the First Italo-Ethiopian War. On 29 July 1900 Victor Emmanuel III ascended to the throne and consequently the regiment was renamed Regiment "Lancieri Vittorio Emanuele II" (10th) on 30 August 1900. In 1911-12 the regiment provided 174 enlisted personnel to augment units fighting in the Italo-Turkish War. Between its founding and World War I the regiment ceded on two occasions one of its squadrons to help form new regiments:
 16 February 1864: Regiment "Lancieri di Foggia" (later renamed: Regiment "Cavalleggeri di Foggia" 11th))
 1 October 1909: Regiment "Lancieri di Vercelli" (26th)

World War I 
At the outbreak of World War I the regiment consisted of a command, the regimental depot, and two cavalry groups, with the I Group consisting of three squadrons and the II Group consisting of two squadrons and a machine gun section. Together with the Regiment "Lancieri di Milano" (7th) the regiment formed the III Cavalry Brigade of the 2nd Cavalry Division of "Veneto". The division fought dismounted in the trenches of the Italian Front. In 1917 the regimental depot in Vicenza formed the 859th Dismounted Machine Gunners Company as reinforcement for infantry units on the front. The same year the regiment fought delaying actions after the Italian defeat in the Battle of Caporetto.

The regiment distinguished itself on 19 June 1918 during the Battle of Monastier, for which it was awarded a Bronze Medal of Military Valour. In October 1918 the regiment fought in the Battle of Vittorio Veneto.

Interwar years 
After the war the Italian Army disbanded 14 of its 30 cavalry regiments and so on 21 November 1919 the II Group of the regiment was renamed "Cavalleggeri di Aquila" as it consisted of personnel and horses from the disbanded Regiment "Cavalleggeri di Aquila" (27th). In early 1920 the regiment moved from Vicenza to Brescia, where it took over the barracks of the disbanded "Cavalleggeri di Aquila". On 20 May 1920 the regiment transferred one of its squadrons to the Regiment "Savoia Cavalleria" (3rd) and received and integrated two squadrons from the disbanded Regiment "Lancieri di Montebello" (8th). On the same date the regiment lost its lances, was renamed Regiment "Cavalleggeri Vittorio Emanuele II". It also received the traditions of the regiments "Cavalleggeri di Catania" (22nd) and "Cavalleggeri di Aquila" (27th).

In 1926 the regiment moved from Brescia to Bologna. On 8 February 1934 the regiment was renamed Regiment "Lancieri Vittorio Emanuele II". In 1935-36 the regiment contributed eight officers and 543 enlisted for units, which were deployed to East Africa for the Second Italo-Ethiopian War.

World War II 

At the outbreak of World War II the regiment consisted of a command, a command squadron, the I and II squadrons groups, each with two mounted squadrons, and the 5th Machine Gunners Squadron. The regiment was assigned to the 2nd Cavalry Division "Emanuele Filiberto Testa di Ferro". In March 1941 the regiment's 4th Squadron was sent to Albania to reinforce the Regiment "Lancieri di Milano" (7th) for the upcoming invasion of Yugoslavia, in which also the 2nd Cavalry Division "Emanuele Filiberto Testa di Ferro" participated. In October of the same year the regiment formed a replacement squadron.

On 1 January 1942 the regiment was reorganized and renamed Armored Regiment "Vittorio Emanuele II". The regiment's organization was now as follows:
 Armored Regiment "Vittorio Emanuele II"
 Command Squadron
 Anti-aircraft Squadron, with 20/65 anti-aircraft guns
 Recovery and Repairs Squadron
 66th Heavy Mobile Workshop
 3x Tank groups
 each group fielded three squadrons equipped with 10x 75/18 self-propelled guns and 7x M15/42 tanks

On 1 May the 2nd Cavalry Division "Emanuele Filiberto Testa di Ferro" was renamed 134th Armored Division "Emanuele Filiberto Testa di Ferro". On 1 August 1942 the regiment left the division and was assigned to the Armored and Motorized Troops Inspectorate. On 1 April 1943 the regiment was assigned to the 135th Armored Cavalry Division "Ariete".

After the announcement of the Armistice of Cassibile on 8 September 1943 the division was tasked with defending Rome against invading German forces. On 9 September 1943 the division blocked the advance of the German 3rd Panzergrenadier Division and elements of the 26th Panzer Division. After the flight of the Italian King Victor Emmanuel III and his government from Rome the division was ordered on 10 September to move to Tivoli and abandon the defense of Rome. There the division, including the "Lancieri Vittorio Emanuele II", was disbanded by the Germans on 12 September 1943.

During the war the regiment's depot in Bologna formed the:
 Command 1st Dismounted Grouping "Lancieri Vittorio Emanuele II"
 II Road Movement Battalion "Lancieri Vittorio Emanuele II"
 VII Road Movement Battalion "Lancieri Vittorio Emanuele II"
 X Machine Gunners Group "Lancieri Vittorio Emanuele II"
 X Dismounted Group "Lancieri Vittorio Emanuele II"
 XI Dismounted Group "Lancieri Vittorio Emanuele II"
 XVIII Dismounted Group "Lancieri Vittorio Emanuele II"
 XXVI Dismounted Group "Lancieri Vittorio Emanuele II"

On 2 June 1940 the X Machine Gunners Group "Lancieri Vittorio Emanuele II" was formed by the regimental depot in Bologna. The group was immediately send to Libya for the invasion of Egypt in September 1940. The group entered Egypt and advanced to Sidi Barrani, where it was destroyed in the opening days of the British Operation Compass offensive.

References

Cavalry Regiments of Italy